Mark Ball is a British artistic director based at the Southbank Centre. He took up the position in January 2022.

References

External links 
 Southbank Centre
 

Year of birth missing (living people)
Place of birth missing (living people)
British artistic directors
Living people
Southbank Centre